The 2021 Southeastern Conference men's basketball tournament was the postseason men's basketball tournament for the Southeastern Conference at Bridgestone Arena in Nashville, Tennessee, which took place March 10–14, 2021.

Seeds
On November 22, 2020, Auburn announced a self-imposed, one year postseason ban due to former assistant coach Chuck Person's involvement in the 2017–18 NCAA Division I men's basketball corruption scandal. As a result, the #11 seed in the tournament was awarded a first-round bye, leaving the #12 seed–#13 seed game as the only game to be played on March 10.  Teams were seeded by conference record, with a tiebreaker system used to seed teams with identical conference records. The top 11 teams received a first round bye and the top four teams received a double bye, automatically advancing them into the quarterfinals.

Schedule

*Game times in Central Time. #Rankings denote tournament seeding.

Bracket

Game summaries

First round

Second round

Quarterfinals

Semifinals

Final

See also 

 2021 SEC women's basketball tournament

References

Tournament
SEC men's basketball tournament
SEC Men's Basketball
Basketball competitions in Nashville, Tennessee
College basketball tournaments in Tennessee